The 2008 Hamburg state election was held on 24 February 2008 to elect the members of the 19th Hamburg Parliament. The incumbent Christian Democratic Union led by First Mayor Ole von Beust government lost its majority. The CDU subsequently formed a coalition government with the Green Alternative List. This was the first time the CDU had formed a state government with the Greens in Germany.

Parties
The table below lists parties represented in the 18th Hamburg Parliament.

Opinion polling

Election result

|-
! colspan="2" | Party
! Votes
! %
! +/-
! Seats 
! +/-
! Seats %
|-
| bgcolor=| 
| align=left | Christian Democratic Union (CDU)
| align=right| 331,067
| align=right| 42.6
| align=right| 4.6
| align=right| 56
| align=right| 7
| align=right| 46.3
|-
| bgcolor=| 
| align=left | Social Democratic Party (SPD)
| align=right| 265,516
| align=right| 34.1
| align=right| 3.6
| align=right| 45
| align=right| 4
| align=right| 37.2
|-
| bgcolor=| 
| align=left | Green Alternative List (GAL)
| align=right| 74,472
| align=right| 9.6
| align=right| 2.7
| align=right| 12
| align=right| 5
| align=right| 9.9
|-
| bgcolor=| 
| align=left | The Left (Linke)
| align=right| 50,132
| align=right| 6.4
| align=right| 6.4
| align=right| 8
| align=right| 8
| align=right| 6.6
|-
! colspan=8|
|-
| bgcolor=| 
| align=left | Free Democratic Party (FDP)
| align=right| 36,953
| align=right| 4.8
| align=right| 2.0
| align=right| 0
| align=right| ±0
| align=right| 0
|-
| bgcolor=| 
| align=left | German People's Union (DVU)
| align=right| 6,354
| align=right| 0.8
| align=right| 0.8
| align=right| 0
| align=right| ±0
| align=right| 0
|-
| bgcolor=|
| align=left | Others
| align=right| 13,037
| align=right| 1.7
| align=right| 
| align=right| 0
| align=right| ±0
| align=right| 0
|-
! align=right colspan=2| Total
! align=right| 777,531
! align=right| 100.0
! align=right| 
! align=right| 121
! align=right| ±0
! align=right| 
|-
! align=right colspan=2| Voter turnout
! align=right| 
! align=right| 63.5
! align=right| 5.2
! align=right| 
! align=right| 
! align=right| 
|}

See also
 Elections in Hamburg
 Hamburg state elections in the Weimar Republic

References

External links 
 The Federal Returning Officer. Retrieved on 2009-08-30.

2008 elections in Germany
2008 state election
2008
February 2008 events in Europe